Aleksandr Blyshchyk (Олександр Блищик, born ) is a Soviet and later Ukrainian male former weightlifter, who competed in the light heavyweight class and represented Soviet Union at international competitions. He won the silver medal at the 1991 World Weightlifting Championships in the 82.5 kg category. He participated at the 1996 Summer Olympics in the 83 kg event.

References

External links
 

1966 births
Living people
Soviet male weightlifters
Ukrainian male weightlifters
World Weightlifting Championships medalists
Place of birth missing (living people)
Olympic weightlifters of Ukraine
Weightlifters at the 1996 Summer Olympics